Montefiore dell'Aso is a comune (municipality) in the Province of Ascoli Piceno in the Italian region Marche, located about  southeast of Ancona and about  northeast of Ascoli Piceno.

One of several Hilltowns in Central Italy, Montefiore dell'Aso borders the following municipalities: Campofilone, Carassai, Lapedona, Massignano, Monterubbiano, Moresco, Petritoli, Ripatransone.

Historical sights include the Romanesque-Gothic church of St. Francis, housing the sepulchres of Cardinal Gentile Partino (1310) and painter Adolfo de Carolis, while the apses has frescoes by the Master of Offida.

References

External links

 Comune di Montefiore dell'Aso | Homepage

Cities and towns in the Marche